Bryantsville is an unincorporated community in Garrard County, Kentucky, United States.  It lies along U.S. Route 27 northwest of the city of Lancaster, the county seat of Garrard County.  Its elevation is 942 feet (287 m).  It has a post office with the ZIP code 40410.

Demographics 
As of 2018, Bryantsville had a population of 6,928. 96.7% of residents were White, 0.9% were Native American, 0.1% were Black, 0.3% were some other race, and 1.9% were two or more races.

Education
Bryantsville is served by Garrard County Public Schools.

References

Unincorporated communities in Garrard County, Kentucky
Unincorporated communities in Kentucky